This page described the qualification procedure for EuroBasket Women 2023. 14 teams joined the co-hosts Israel and Slovenia.

Draw
The draw took place on 20 August 2021.

Seeding
Teams were seeded according to FIBA rankings.

Groups
The ten group winners and the four best second-ranked teams qualified for the final tournament.

All times are local.

Group A

Group B

Group C

Group D

Group E

Group F

Group G

Group H

Group I

Group J

Ranking of second-placed teams
The best four second-placed teams from the qualifying groups (except groups F and I) qualified for the final tournament. If one, or both, of the hosts are in qualifying spots, the next best-ranked second placed teams would qualify. Matches against the fourth-placed team in each group were not included in this ranking.

Qualified teams

Notes

References

External links
Official website

EuroBasket Women qualification
2021–22 in European women's basketball